This is a list of languages and groups of languages that developed within Jewish diaspora communities through contact with surrounding languages.

Afro-Asiatic languages

Cushitic languages 
 Kayla
 Qwara

Semitic languages

Arabic languages 
 Judeo-Arabic
 Judeo-Algerian Arabic (extinct)
 Judeo-Andalusian Arabic (extinct)
 Judeo-Egyptian Arabic (extinct)
 Judeo-Iraqi Arabic 
 Judeo-Levantine Arabic (extinct)
 Judeo-Moroccan Arabic
 Judeo-Tripolitanian Arabic 
 Judeo-Tunisian Arabic
 Judeo-Yemeni Arabic 

 Karaite Egyptian Arabic, based on old Egyptian Arabic

Aramaic languages 
 Judeo-Aramaic

 Hulaulá (Persian Kurdistani Jewish Neo-Aramaic)
 Jewish Palestinian Aramaic (extinct)
 Galilean dialect (extinct)
 Lishana Deni (Zakho Jewish Neo-Aramaic)
 Lishan Didan (Persian Azerbaijani Jewish Neo-Aramaic)
 Lishanid Noshan (Arbil Jewish Neo-Aramaic)

Other Afro-Asiatic languages 
 Judeo-Berber (a group of different Jewish Berber languages and their dialects)

Dravidian languages 
 Judeo-Malayalam 

(both written in local alphabets)

Indo-European languages

Germanic languages 
 Jewish English languages 
 Lachoudisch (extinct)
 Lotegorisch (extinct)
 Yiddish
 Eastern Yiddish
 Western Yiddish

Indo-Aryan languages 
 Judeo-Gujarati
 Judeo-Hindustani
 Judeo-Marathi
 Judeo-Urdu

Iranian languages 
 Judeo-Bukharic (Bukhari, Bukhori, Judeo-Tajik) (with some city koinés, e.g., Judeo-Tajik koiné of Samarkand)
 Judeo-Golpaygani (Possibly extinct) 
 Judeo-Hamedani (Possibly extinct)
 Judeo-Persian (Dzhidi, Jidi)
 Judeo-Shirazi
 Judeo-Tat (Juhuri)

Romance languages 
 Judeo-Latin (extinct or evolved into Judeo-Romance languages)
 Judeo-Aragonese (extinct, but have some impact on Judeo-Spanish citylect of Skopje) 
 Judeo-Navarro-Aragonese with a significant Jewish koiné of Tudela (extinct)
 Judeo-Asturleonese (extinct, but still have some lexical traces in Judeo-Spanish)
 Judeo-Emilian-Romagnol (e.g., the citilects of Modena, and Ferrara) (almost extinct)
 Judeo-French (Zarphatic): a group of Jewish northern oïl languages and their dialects (extinct)

 Judeo-Gascon (also was used by latest Sephardic migrants) (extinct)

 Judeo-Italian with a wide range of dialects and city koinés (including zones of so-called Toscani (Tuscan, e.g. the citylect of Livorno) and Mediani (Middle Italian, besides all the city koiné of Rome) dialects)
 Judeo-Lombard (e.g., the citylect of Mantua) (almost extinct)
 Judeo-Piedmontese (almost extinct)
 Judeo-Portuguese (almost extinct, still preserved in small communities of Portugal, Northern Africa and the Netherlands) and Judeo-Galician (extinct)
 Judeo-Provençal (extinct)
 Judeo-Sicilian (including the zone of so-called Meridionali Estremi (Far Southern) dialects of Sicily, Calabria and Apulia, including Judeo-Salentino of Corfu) (extinct or almost extinct)
Judeo-Southern Italian varieties (including the zone of so-called Meridionali (Intermediate Southern Italian) dialects) (almost extinct) 
Judeo-Spanish (Judezmo, Ladino)
Haketia
Tetuani

 Judeo-Venetian, including Judeo-Venetian of Corfu (almost extinct)

Other Indo-European languages 
 Judeo-Czech (Knaanic) (extinct)
 Judeo-Greek (Romaniyot, Yevanic)
 Judeo-Sicilian Greek (extinct)
 Judeo-Koiné Greek (extinct)

Kartvelian languages 
 Judeo-Georgian
 Judeo-Mingrelian (first of all — so called Zugdidi–Samurzakano dialect of Mingrelian, e.g. Bandza and Senaki Jews in Western Georgia, but the tendency is to switch to Judeo-Georgian or to standard Georgian) (almost extinct)

Turkic languages 
 Judeo-Azerbaijani (dialect of previously Aramaic-speaking Jews of Miyandoab)
 Judeo-Crimean Tatar (Krymchak) (almost extinct)
 Judeo-Turkish (Influenced the Krymchak and some of Karaim languages, or even was the origin of some of them)
 Karaim (almost extinct, most likely a group of separate Turkic languages with Kypchak and Oghuz traces                                     With Hebrew words)

See also 
 Jewish languages

References 

Jewish diaspora
Jewish diaspora
Jewish languages